Marguerite Buffet (unknown – 1680) was a French writer, grammarian, and teacher. Buffet is recognized for her contribution to the pro-woman side of the querelle des femmes – " a debate about the nature and worth of women that unfolded in Europe from the medieval to the early modern period." Her "only extant work", published in 1668, "is the Nouvelles observations sur la langue françoise, Où il est traitté des termes anciens & inusitez, & du bel usage des mots nouveaux. Avec les Éloges des Illustres Sçavantes, tant Anciennes que Modernes (New Observations on the French Language, in which Ancient and Unusual Terms are Discussed, and the Appropriate Use of New Words. With Praises of Illustrious Learned Women, both Ancient and Modern)".

References

External links 
 Querelle | Marguerite Buffet Querelle.ca is a website devoted to the works of authors contributing to the pro-woman side of the querelle des femmes.

1680 deaths
French women writers
17th-century French writers
Year of birth unknown